The Lavaca-Navidad River Authority or LNRA was formed in August, 1941 by the Texas legislature.  Its regulatory authority is authorized by Article 16, Section 59, of the Texas Constitution, codified in Vernon's Annotated Texas Civil Statutes as Article 8280-131.  Its main concerns are water conservation in the Lavaca River and Navidad River basins within the boundaries of Jackson County, Texas. The authority maintains its headquarters at 4631 Farm to Market Road 3131 in unincorporated Jackson County, near the City of Edna.

Reservoir 

The LNRA currently operates the Palmetto Bend Dam on the Navidad River which forms Lake Texana.

See also 
 List of Texas river authorities

References

External links
 Lavaca-Navidad River Authority

Companies based in Texas
Public utilities established in 1941
Jackson County, Texas
River authorities of Texas
State agencies of Texas
Water companies of the United States
1941 establishments in Texas